Karin Wagner (née Geese; born 26 August 1952) is a German high jumper, who was successful in the 1970s.

Biography
Karin Wagner first competed for TV St. Ingbert 1881 e.V. and later for USC Mainz in Mainz. She won her sole German outdoor championship in 1974 when she beat Ulrike Meyfarth clearing 1.85 meters. She led the German rankings in 1974 with a best of 1.86 meters. At the German Indoor Championships she finished second thrice, 1971,1972 and 1974.

References

Living people
German female high jumpers
1952 births